Jabal Kandi (also Romanized as Jabal Kandī and Jabalkandī) is a village in Anzal-e Jonubi Rural District, Anzal District, Urmia County, West Azerbaijan Province, Iran. At the 2006 census, its population was 388, in 84 families. This village is populated by Azerbaijanis.

References 

Populated places in Urmia County